Juana Acosta Restrepo (born 28 November 1976) is a Colombian-Spanish actress. She has appeared in more than 40 films.

Biography 
Juana Acosta was born in Cali, Valle del Cauca, on 28 November 1976. She made her television debut with an appearance in the Colombian telenovela Mascarada, whereas she made her film debut featuring in the 1998 film Time Out. She moved to Spain in 2000, making her debut in Spanish television with an appearance in Policías, en el corazón de la calle. She has a daughter with her ex-partner, fellow actor Ernesto Alterio. She earned a nomination to the Goya Award for Best Supporting Actress for her performance in the 2020 film One Careful Owner.

Selected filmography

Film

Television

Accolades

References

External links 

1976 births
Living people
Colombian film actresses
Spanish film actresses
Spanish television actresses
21st-century Colombian actresses
21st-century Spanish actresses